Leticia Callejas Bautista more known as Buda Bautista is a former Philippine international footballer and is the head coach of the Philippine women's national football team.

Playing career 

Bautista was part of the national squad that participated at the 2003 FIFA Women's World Cup qualifiers

Coaching career

Philippines U-19
Bautista was named as head coach of the Philippines U19 (women's) for the 2013 AFC U-19 Women's Championship qualification.

Philippines
Bautista was appointed as the head coach of the Philippine women's national football team in April 2015 becoming the first woman to lead the women's senior national team of the Philippines.

Bautista mentored the national squad which secured qualification for the 2018 AFC Women's Asian Cup. She was succeeded by Marnelli Dimzon who took over her position by July 2017.

She was shortlisted for the 2017 AFC Women's Coach Of The Year Award along with Gao Hong of China and Asako Takakura of Japan.

Bautista returns as the head coach of the Philippine women's national team by June 2018 and guided the team in the 2018 AFF Women's Championship. Like in her first national team stint, she was again succeeded by Marnelli Dimzon in August 2018.

Statistics

Managerial

References

1973 births
Living people
Filipino women's footballers
Philippines women's international footballers
Female association football managers
Philippines women's national football team managers
Filipino football head coaches
Women's association football defenders
People from San Juan, Metro Manila
Footballers from Metro Manila